Ryan Dominic Blair (born 23 February 1996) is a Scottish professional footballer who plays as a midfielder for Dumbarton.

Career

Falkirk
Born in Glasgow, Blair began his career at Falkirk, and made his professional debut for the club on 6 September 2014 against Stranraer in the Scottish Challenge Cup.

In the 2015–16 season he made seven appearances for the side in the Scottish Championship, one appearance in the Scottish League Cup, and one appearance in the Scottish Cup.

Swansea City
Blair moved to Swansea City in January 2016 for an undisclosed fee, signing a three-and-a-half year contract and joining up with their under-21 squad.

Blair returned to Falkirk on loan in January 2018, where he played eight times and scored once. In January 2019, he signed for Falkirk's derby rivals Dunfermline Athletic on a short-term loan deal until the end of the 2018–19 season.

He was released by the club in July 2019.

Stenhousemuir 
Blair returned to Scotland on a permanent basis, joining Stenhousemuir on 29 November 2019. Blair was among 18 players released by the club in May 2021.

East Kilbride 
Blair joined Lowland League side East Kilbride in October 2021 and left for league 1 side East Fife three months later in 2022.

East Fife  
After leaving East Kilbride after only four months, Blair joined Methil side East Fife on 2nd January 2022.

Dumbarton 
Having left East Fife, Blair joined Scottish League Two side Dumbarton in June 2022. He scored his first goal for the club with a superb free-kick against Elgin City in February 2023.

Career statistics

As of 22:19 March 18, 2023.

References

External links

Footballers from Glasgow
1996 births
Living people
Association football midfielders
Scottish footballers
Scottish Professional Football League players
Falkirk F.C. players
Swansea City A.F.C. players
Dunfermline Athletic F.C. players
Stenhousemuir F.C. players
East Kilbride F.C. players
East Fife F.C. players
Dumbarton F.C. players